The International Council of Community Churches (ICCC) is a Christian religious association of ecumenically co-operating Protestants and Independent Catholics. Based in Frankfort, Illinois, in the United States, it is the main organization of the Community Church movement. The ICCC is a member of Churches Uniting in Christ, the National Council of Churches of Christ in the USA and the World Council of Churches. In 2010, the ICCC had 148 congregations with 68,300 members. Membership is concentrated primarily in the Midwest. However, there are several congregations in California, New York, and Florida. According to the World Council of Churches, the council has 108,806 members worldwide.

History
In 1950, the biennial council of the Peoples Church of Christ and Community Centers led by Joseph M. Evans (until then all Afro-American) and the National Council of Community Churches led by the Rev. Roy A. Burkhardt (until then all Caucasian) joined in a historic merger. At the time, their joining represented the largest interracial merger of religious bodies in America. The new creation was the International Council of Community Churches. Member churches united to be a fellowship of ecumenically minded, freedom-loving congregations cooperating in fulfilling the mission of the church in the world. As a post-denominational movement, the council has witnessed and worked for Christian unity, justice and reconciliation in human society.

Government
The council operates with an “inverted” pyramid of authority. The local congregations own the council and determine its emphases and operation. They do so by sending delegates to an annual conference. Each local church is entitled to two voting delegates, of which both may be laity or one each lay and clergy (but not two clergy.) Decisions about council policy are made by the local church delegates voting at the annual conference. Delegates elect a volunteer board. The board hires and supervises staff and oversees everyday operations. The Rev. Phil Tom is the current council minister.

See also
Churches Uniting in Christ

References

External links
Official website

Members of the National Council of Churches
Members of the World Council of Churches